Fleischmanniopsis is a genus of Mesoamerican flowering plants in the family Asteraceae.

 Species
 Fleischmanniopsis anomalochaeta R.M.King & H.Rob. - El Salvador, Guatemala
 Fleischmanniopsis langmaniae R.M.King & H.Rob. - Chiapas.  The species name langmaniae was given in honor of Ida Kaplan Langman.
 Fleischmanniopsis leucocephala (Benth.) R.M.King & H.Rob. - Veracruz, Oaxaca, Chiapas, Guatemala, El Salvador, Honduras, Nicaragua
 Fleischmanniopsis mendax (Standl. & Steyerm.) R.M.King & H.Rob.- Guatemala, Oaxaca
 Fleischmanniopsis nubigenoides (B.L.Rob.) R.M.King & H.Rob. - Chiapas, Guatemala

References

Eupatorieae
Asteraceae genera
Flora of North America